Common names: Middle American rattlesnake, Central American rattlesnake, tzabcan (local name for subspecies C. s. tzabcan)

Crotalus simus is a venomous pit viper species found in Mexico and Central America. The specific epithet is Latin for "flat-nosed", likely because its head is blunt compared with lanceheads (Bothrops). Three subspecies are recognized, including the nominate subspecies described here.

Description
Adults commonly exceed  in length, with males growing larger than females. Large males reach  in some populations.

The body has a rough appearance because the dorsal scale keels are accentuated into protuberances or tuberculations. This is most apparent on the scale rows on either side of the body with a decreasing intensity in the lower rows. The vertebral scales are about as prominently keeled as the fourth row down on the flanks (with the vertebral scales as the first row).

Distribution and habitat
The species is found from Mexico in southwestern Michoacán on the Pacific coast, and Veracruz and the Yucatan Peninsula on the Atlantic coast, south through Belize, Guatemala, El Salvador, Honduras, and Nicaragua to west-central Costa Rica. It is absent from Panama, but apparently does occur on the Atlantic side of Colombia. The type locality given is "Ceylan", which is incorrect. Its habitats are semiarid, including dry or very dry tropical forests, thorn woodland, and arid scrub forest. It also occurs in mesic forests with relatively dry, open areas.

Uses
To the Mayans and their living descendants, the Yucatan subspecies (C. s. tzabcan) was greatly revered. The word tzabcan means rattlesnake in Mayan. What the rattlesnake actually symbolizes is unknown, but many temples have carved rattlesnake shapes. Shamans also dry and roast snakes, grinding them into a powder used as medicine.

Venom
Bites are similar to rattlesnake bites in the United States. Local symptoms may be severe, with pain, massive swelling, blistering, and necrosis that lead to fasciotomies and in some cases amputations. Systemic effects involving hemostatic disturbances are rare, as are kidney failure, and neurotoxicity. Only venom from neonates contains crotoxin; a constituent typically found in C. durissus venom that produces neurotoxic symptoms.

Taxonomy
Previously, until 2004, the description for this form was listed as the nominate subspecies for the tropical rattlesnake, C. durissus. Molecular genetic data suggest the taxa culminatus and tzabcan should be considered as separate species from C. simus

References

Further reading
 Sonnini, C.S. & Latreille, P.A. 1801. Histoire naturelle des Reptiles, avec figures dessinées d'après nature; Tome III. Seconde Partie. Serpens. Crapelet. Paris. 335 pp. (Crotalus simus, p. 202.)

simus
Reptiles of Guatemala
Reptiles described in 1801